The use of a royal motto is an old tradition among Danish monarchs, dating back at least 500 years. The use of such a motto was a way for a monarch to emphasize values or beliefs he / she held dear. In earlier times, these mottos were often shown on Danish coinage, often in a Latin form.

Since the time of Christian VIII, Danish monarchs have only used mottos in the Danish language.

References

See also
 List of Danish monarchs
 Royal mottos of Swedish monarchs
 Royal mottos of Norwegian monarchs

Danish monarchy
Denmark